is a light novel written by Nisio Isin and released on August 1, 2006. The story is a prequel to the manga Death Note, and expands on the briefly-mentioned Los Angeles "BB Murder Cases".

Plot
The story is narrated by Mello, a character from the manga. It recounts the time the detective L worked with FBI agent Naomi Misora to stop a violent serial killer in the United States. The murderer calls himself "Beyond Birthday", or BB.

On hearing about the murders, L recruits Misora to investigate. She meets a detective who introduces himself as Rue Ryuzaki. The investigation reveals that each murder leaves clues to the next, and Misora and Ryuzaki follow the trail to the point where they can predict the final murder. Misora identifies Ryuzaki as the murderer and arrests him.

At the end of the story, Misora meets a strange young man who reminds her of B, who asks, as L does in the manga, "Please call me Ryuzaki". Despite Misora's belief that she never spoke to L in person, this anonymous encounter is their only face-to-face meeting.

References

2006 Japanese novels
Death Note
Light novels
Novels set in Los Angeles
Shueisha books
Nisio Isin
Viz Media novels